Stingray Country is a Canadian English language discretionary specialty channel owned by Stingray Digital. The channel broadcasts music videos relating to country music.

History
The channel launched on May 13, 2019 on Roku; later launching on January 15, 2020 on Bell-owned television systems including Bell Satellite, Bell Aliant, and Bell Fibe TV, replacing Stingray Juicebox. The channel's launch followed CMT's decision in 2017 to stop playing music videos, leaving no dedicated channel for country music videos to air on Canadian television.

Over a month after its launch on Canadian television service providers, Stingray Group announced its official launch on February 18, 2020, noting it has since increased its coverage by launching on additional providers including Eastlink, Cogeco, Shaw Direct, Telus, Comwave, and Vidéotron.

Programming
Since the channels launch, its programming has exclusively been music video programs, primarily featuring videos released during the 1990s to current day.

Current programs airing on the channel include:
Country Roundup - mix of country music videos from the 1990s to current day
Tailgate Party - upbeat country music videos 
Hot Country - current day country music video hits
Smooth Country - slow tempo and ballad country music videos 
Country Throwback - country music videos from the 1990s to early 2000s
Stingray Country Hot 20 - country music countdown of current day hits

References

External links
 Official site

L
Commercial-free television networks
Music video networks in Canada
Television channels and stations established in 2019
Digital cable television networks in Canada
English-language television stations in Canada
Country music mass media